Asparuh "Paro" Donev Nikodimov (born 21 August 1945) is a Bulgarian former football player and coach.

He represented Bulgaria at the FIFA World Cups in 1970 and 1974.

Playing career 

Nikodimov began playing football at the age of 16 in the youth team of Septemvri Sofia, where he played until he joined CSKA Sofia at the age of 19.

In 1964 Nikodimov joined CSKA Sofia. During his time at CSKA, he won many honours, including six A PFG titles and five Bulgarian Cups. He played 296 league matches, scoring 58 goals for 11 seasons.

Nikodimov ended his career in 1978, playing for Sliven.

Managerial career 
Nikodimov began his managerial career with CSKA Sofia in 1979, guiding them to four consecutive league titles.

Honours

Player honours 
CSKA Sofia
 Bulgarian League: 1965–66, 1968–69, 1970–71, 1971–72, 1972–73, 1974–75
 Bulgarian Cup: 1965, 1969, 1972, 1973, 1974

Managerial honours 
CSKA Sofia
 Bulgarian League: 1979–80, 1980–81, 1981–82, 1982–83, 1991–92
 Bulgarian Cup: 1983

Personal life 
Nikodimov is married to Svetla and has two daughters who are volleyball players.

References 

1945 births
Living people
Bulgarian footballers
Bulgaria international footballers
Olympic footballers of Bulgaria
Footballers at the 1968 Summer Olympics
1970 FIFA World Cup players
1974 FIFA World Cup players
Olympic silver medalists for Bulgaria
Olympic medalists in football
FC Septemvri Sofia players
PFC CSKA Sofia players
First Professional Football League (Bulgaria) players
Bulgarian football managers
PFC CSKA Sofia managers
Expatriate football managers in Tunisia
Étoile Sportive du Sahel managers
AC Omonia managers
Expatriate football managers in Cyprus
Footballers from Sofia
PFC Beroe Stara Zagora managers
Medalists at the 1968 Summer Olympics
Association football midfielders
Bulgarian expatriate football managers